Ad-lib Night (lit. "A Very Special Guest") is the third film by South Korean director Lee Yoon-ki. A group of boys from the country who have come to Seoul to find the runaway daughter of a dying man to be with him on his death bed. The film, based on a short story by Japanese writer Azuko Taira, debuted at the 11th annual Pusan International Film Festival as well as 57th Berlin International Film Festival.

Plot
Bo-kyung (Han Hyo-joo) is approached by two young men from the countryside, who are both convinced she is Myung-eun, a girl who left the village years ago and whose father is now dying. When they realize she isn't who they think she is, the more outspoken of the pair, Ki-yeong (Kim Young-min), asks her to be the "stand-in" for a night, so that the old man can die after seeing his estranged daughter one last time. Despite her hesitation, she gets in their car.

Cast
Han Hyo-joo – Lee Bo-kyung
Kim Young-min – Ki-yeong
Choi Il-hwa – Ji-ho's father
Yoon Hee-seok – Nam Taek-jong
Lee Hyun-jung – Ji-ho's mother
Kim Jung-ki – Young-eun's uncle
Shin Yeong-jin – Young-eun's aunt
Kwon Da-hyun – Lee Jin-young
Gi Ju-bong – Myung-eun's father
Kim Hye-ok – Myung-eun's mother
Bae Jong-ok – Bo-kyung's mother (voice)
Jin Yong-wook – Lee Sung-wook 
Lee Seung-yeon
Yeo Min-gu

Awards

2006
26th Korean Association of Film Critics Awards: Best New Actress (Han Hyo-joo)

2007
20th Singapore International Film Festival- Silver Screen Award: Best Actress (Han Hyo-joo)
9th Deauville Asian Film Festival: Lotus Air France – Prix de la Critique Internationale (International Critics' Prize)

References

External links
 영화'아주 특별한 손님'공식카페 : 네이버 카페
 
 
 

2006 films
2006 drama films
South Korean drama films
Films based on short fiction
Films directed by Lee Yoon-ki
Sponge Entertainment films
2000s Korean-language films
2000s South Korean films